The 1867–1868 Georgia State Constitutional Convention was held for the purpose of constructing a constitution for the state following the end of the American Civil War. Held in Atlanta, the convention started on December 9, 1867 and ran through March 1868.

Its delegates included 137 white men and 33 African American men. It was the first constitutional convention to involve the participation of African-American delegates. It created a new constitution for Georgia that included suffrage for African-American males; this was a mandate of the congressional Reconstruction Acts.

Delegates
Delegates to the convention were elected by district. Its members included the following:

First Election District
 M. H. Bentley
 Aaron Alpeoria Bradley
 Walter L. Clift
 A. L. Harris
 C. H. Hopkins
 W. H. D. Reynolds
 Isaac Seeley
 James Stewart

Second Election District
 Tunis G. Campbell
 William A. Goulding

Third Election District
 A. M. Moore

Fourth Election District
 F. M. Smith

Fifth Election District
 P. B. Bedford

Sixth Election District
 Levi J. Knight
 Lewis H. Roberts

Seventh Election District
 W. C. Carson
 J. L. Cutler
 M. C. Smith

Eighth Election District
 John Higden
 B. F. Powell
 Richard H. Whiteley

Ninth Election District
 H. H. Christian
 William W. Dews
 Charles C. Martin

Tenth Election District
 Philip Joiner
 John Murphy
 Benjamin Sikes
 F. O. Welch

Eleventh Election District
 Robert Alexander
 J. A. Jackson
 W. H. Noble
 John Whitaker

Twelfth Election District
 J. E. Blount
 G. W. Chatters
 Thomas Crayton

Thirteenth Election District)
 Jesse Dinkins
 J. E. Hall
 Robert Lumpkin
 H. K. McCoy
 F. Snead

Fourteenth Election District
 J. M. Buchan
 S. F. Salter
 Simeon Stanley
 J. W. Trawick

Fifteenth Election District
 A. J. Cameron

Sixteenth Election District
 E. W. Lane
 George Linder

Seventeenth Election District
 Malcolm Claiborne
 H. H. Glisson
 J. A. Madden
 J. M. Rice
 Robert Whitehead

Eighteenth Election District
 Simeon Beard
 Foster Blodgett
 J. E. Bryant
 Rufus B. Bullock
 Benjamin Conley
 John Neal
 Alexander Stone

Nineteenth Election District
 Joseph Adkins
 D. P. Baldwin
 John W. T. Catchings
 Robert Crumbley
 Henry Strickland

Twentieth Election District
 William Henry Harrison
 Daniel Palmer
 Charles H. Prince
 C. C. Richardson
 W. C. Supple
 George Wallace

Twenty-first Election District
 Thomas Gibson
 Samuel Gove
 William Griffin
 Charles Hooks

Twenty-second Election District
 F. Wooten
 A. Bowdoin
 M. Cooper
 W. J. Howe
 M. A. Potts
 T. J. Speer
 Henry McNeal Turner
 G. G. Wilbur

Twenty-third Election District
 J. H. Anderson
 S. A. Cobb
 William P. Edwards
 Posey Maddox
 O. H. Walton

Twenty-fourth Election District
 George W. Ashburn
 J. C. Casey
 Thomas Gilbert
 Van Jones
 J. G. Maul

Twenty-fifth Election District
 T. J. Costin
 William Guilford
 E. J. Higbee
 L. L. Stanford
 Samuel Williams

Twenty-sixth Election District
 S. T. W. Minor
 W. H. Rozar
 W. H. Whitehead

Twenty-seventh Election District
 James C. Barton
 J. W. Christian
 C. D. Davis
 John Harris
 N. P. Hotchkiss

Twenty-eighth Election District
 A. G. Foster
 H. S. Glover
 J. R. Hudson
 William F. Jordan
 T. P. Saffold

Twenty-ninth Election District
 D. G. Cotting
 James Knox
 Romulus Moore
 Lewis Pope
 Josiah Sherman

Thirtieth Election District
 Amos T. Akerman
 J. Bell
 E. S. Cobb
 J. McWhorter

Thirty-first Election District
 William F. Bowers
 S. W. Crawford
 Philip Martin

Thirty-second Election District
 Milton Moore
 J. A. Woody

Thirty-third Election District
 Madison Bell
 Benjamin Dunnigan
 William L. Marler

Thirty-fourth Election District
 J. R. Bracewell
 Shadrick Brown
 S. E. Dailey
 J. Mathews
 B. D. Shumate

Thirty-fifth Election District
 Nedom L. Angier
 H. G. Cole
 James L. Dunning
 J. H. Flinn
 David Irwin
 W. C. Lee
 H. V. M. Miller

Thirty-sixth Election District
 J. S. Bigby
 J. C. Bowden
 P. W. Chambers
 J. W. Key
 W. C. Smith

Thirty-seventh Election District
 John H. Caldwell
 A. H. Harrison
 George Harlan
 E. B. Martin
 Robert Robertson

Thirty-eighth Election District
 T. J. Foster
 R. B. Hutcherson
 J. D. Waddell

Thirty-ninth Election District
 A. W. Holcombe
 S. T. Houston
 J. G. Lott

Fortieth Election District
 John Bryson
 W. T. Crane

Forty-first Election District
 C. A. Ellington
 Wilkey McHan

Forty-second Election District
 George B. Burnett
 William A. Fort
 W. L. Goodwin
 J. R. Parrott
 Wesley Shropshire

Forty-third Election District
 S. E. Fields
 John H. King
 Leander Newton Trammell

Forty-fourth Election District
 John M. Shields
 Presley Yates

See also 
Constitution of Georgia (U.S. state)
Original 33

References 

American constitutional conventions
Constitution of Georgia (U.S. state)